Cereus aethiops is a species of cactus found in Brazil.

References

External links
 
 

aethiops